Westminster International University in Tashkent (WIUT) is the first international university in Uzbekistan and first in Central Asia to offer Western education, with United Kingdom (UK) qualifications. WIUT was established in 2002 in partnership between the "UMID" Presidential Foundation, the Ministry of Higher and Secondary Specialized Education of Uzbekistan, and the University of Westminster in London (UoW).

WIUT's mission is to provide International Standards of Education and Research Opportunities that contribute to the Intellectual, Social and Professional development of the Central Asian communities as well as Global Community.

Background
WIUT provides programmes at undergraduate, graduate and postgraduate levels. WIUT faculty have international degrees and experience in international organizations. Many faculty have earned doctoral degrees from leading universities in Australia, Belgium, China, Czech Republic, England, France, Germany, Japan, Spain and USA.

University schools (academic structure)
Starting from 2020, the University transitioned to a new academic administration structure. According to the new established structure there are three schools operating at WIUT: (i) School of Business and Economics; (ii) School of Law, Technology and Education, and (iii) the Graduate School, offering doctoral programmes. Each school contains academic departments with subject areas. 

(i) School of Business and Economics:
- Economics
- Finance
- Management & Marketing

(ii) School of Law, Technology and Education
- Law 
- Computing
- Global Education

(iii) The Graduate School
- PhD
- DSc

See also

TEAM University
Turin Polytechnic University in Tashkent
Yeoju Technical Institute in Tashkent
Academic Lyceum of Westminster International University in Tashkent
Inha University in Tashkent
Tashkent State Technical University
Tashkent Institute of Irrigation and Melioration
Tashkent Financial Institute
Moscow State University in Tashkent named M.V Lomonosov
Tashkent Automobile and Road Construction Institute
Tashkent State University of Economics
Tashkent State Agrarian University
Tashkent State University of Law
Tashkent University of Information Technologies
University of World Economy and Diplomacy
Universities in the United Kingdom
Education in England
Education in Uzbekistan
Tashkent

Universities in Uzbekistan
University of Westminster
Education in Tashkent
Buildings and structures in Tashkent